Ernest Frank Cribb (August 4, 1885 – August 18, 1957) was a Canadian sailor who competed in the 1932 Summer Olympics.

In 1932 he was a crew member of the Canadian boat Santa Maria which won the silver medal in the 8 metre class. He died in Vancouver.

External links
Ernest Cribb's profile at databaseOlympics
Ernest Cribb's profile at Sports Reference.com

1885 births
1957 deaths
Canadian male sailors (sport)
Olympic sailors of Canada
Olympic silver medalists for Canada
Sailors at the 1932 Summer Olympics – 8 Metre
Olympic medalists in sailing
Medalists at the 1932 Summer Olympics
20th-century Canadian people